Superwarfarins are highly potent vitamin K antagonist anticoagulants that are used as rodenticides. They are called superwarfarins because they are much more potent and long acting than warfarin.

Examples
Brodifacoum
Bromadiolone
Difenacoum
Flocoumafen

References

Vitamin K antagonists
Anticoagulant rodenticides